SM UC-27 was a German Type UC II minelaying submarine or U-boat in the German Imperial Navy during World War I. The U-boat was ordered on 29 August 1915 and was launched on 28 June 1916. She was commissioned into the German Imperial Navy on 25 July 1916 as SM UC-27. In 14 patrols UC-27 was credited with sinking 58 ships, either by torpedo or by mines laid.

SS Skifted left from Mariehamn at 8:30 o'clock 14 December 1916, carrying 56 military persons, 7 workers, 15 members of the crew and 13 civilians, a total of 91 persons. One hour later it was hit by the sea mines laid by the UC-27 and sank soon near Ledsun on the territory of the Lemland municipality of Åland. 86 persons died.

UC-27 was surrendered to France on 3 February 1919 and was broken up at Landerneau in July 1921.

Design
A German Type UC II submarine, UC-27 had a displacement of  when at the surface and  while submerged. The submarine was powered by two six-cylinder four-stroke diesel engines each producing  (a total of ), two electric motors producing , and two propeller shafts.

UC-27 was fitted with six  mine tubes, eighteen UC 200 mines, three  torpedo tubes (one on the stern and two on the bow), seven torpedoes, and one  Uk L/30 deck gun. Her complement was twenty-six crew members.

Summary of raiding history

Notes

References

Bibliography

 
 

Ships built in Hamburg
German Type UC II submarines
U-boats commissioned in 1916
World War I minelayers of Germany
World War I submarines of Germany
1916 ships